is a tactical role-playing game developed by Idea Factory and released for the PlayStation 2 in 2006. The latter version was published in North America by Aksys Games in 2010 and 2012 in Europe by Rising Star Games.

Gameplay
The gameplay is non-linear, allowing the player to progress through the game and the story in whatever order they wish. In addition, instead of having separate screens or maps for exploration and battle, the game features a seamless transition between the two gameplay types.

Actions such as Chain, Charge, Hold, Original Skill, Chain Skill, Special Chain Skill, Break, Break Arts, and Overkill are available during battle. The player can position forces on the battlefield and wait for the right moment to string together the combo attacks using multiple party members, both in melee and at range. Blazing Souls allows the player to create over 200 different items and skills as well as the ability to capture monsters and have them placed within the party.

Plot

Set nearly two decades following the end of the Seven Years' War chronicled in Spectral Souls II's True Ending (modified Rozess Army route) the story follows the somewhat random misadventures of  a freelance Contractor named Zelos and crew, who by various circumstances, is at the center of a conflict involving Elemental Cores which both beings called Human Genomes and a group known as the Original Saints are also searching for as these Elemental Cores are both the key to healing the war ravaged world of Neverland and the trigger for enthroning the intended successors of the current humanity, the Human Genome as the new dominant race.  Along the way various subplots involving the cast flesh out this 'war behind the scenes".

References

External links
Blazing Souls Accelate - official website for mobile version Android/iOS
Official site 
Blazing Souls Accelate official website 
Blazing Souls Accelate official website 
Release and gameplay article
Release article

2006 video games
Android (operating system) games
IOS games
PlayStation 2 games
PlayStation Portable games
Tactical role-playing video games
Video games developed in Japan
Xbox 360 games
Idea Factory games
Single-player video games